Calhoun Mill, also known as Rogers Mill, is a historic grist mill located near Mount Carmel, McCormick County, South Carolina.  It was built about 1860, and is a three-story, with basement, brick building.  Also on the property are contributing sheds and a cotton gin, a race, and a mill dam.  A mill operated on the site since the 1770s.

It was listed on the National Register of Historic Places in 1980.

References

Grinding mills on the National Register of Historic Places in South Carolina
Industrial buildings completed in 1860
Buildings and structures in McCormick County, South Carolina
National Register of Historic Places in McCormick County, South Carolina
Grinding mills in South Carolina